Arthur Moses (born 3 March 1973) is a Ghanaian former professional footballer who played as a striker. He is the owner and vice-president of Bechem Chelsea.

Club career
Moses was born in Accra. In 1992, he was the leading scorer in the Nigerian Premier League with 11 as Stationery Stores won their final league title.

Moses joined French club Toulon on a two-year loan from German club Fortuna Düsseldorf in July 1995. Toulon secured an option to sign him permanently for €3 million.

In June 1997 Toulon was unable to exercise its option and sold it on to Marseille. In August Moses moved on a season-long loan to Marseille with the transfer fee for a permanent move again set at €3 million. In June 1998, Marseille agreed a transfer fee of less than €3 million and in August, Moses signed a three-year contract with Marseille.

International career
Moses played for the Ghana national team at the 1998 African Cup of Nations.

Post-playing career
On 31 October 2008, Moses became owner of Bechem Chelsea along with Tony Yeboah.

References

External links
 
 
 

1973 births
Living people
Footballers from Accra
Ghanaian footballers
Association football forwards
Ghana international footballers
1998 African Cup of Nations players
2. Bundesliga players
Ligue 1 players
Ligue 2 players
UAE Pro League players
Stationery Stores F.C. players
Fortuna Düsseldorf players
SC Toulon players
Olympique de Marseille players
Nîmes Olympique players
Al Shabab Al Arabi Club Dubai players
Al Ain FC players
Ghanaian expatriate footballers
Ghanaian expatriate sportspeople in Nigeria
Expatriate footballers in Nigeria
Ghanaian expatriate sportspeople in Germany
Expatriate footballers in Germany
Ghanaian expatriate sportspeople in France
Expatriate footballers in France
Ghanaian expatriate sportspeople in the United Arab Emirates
Expatriate footballers in the United Arab Emirates